Thea is a feminine given name, from Greek Θεία, Theía, "Goddess". Other forms include Tea and Téa.

People
 Thea Andrews, Canadian journalist
 Thea Astley (1925–2004), Australian writer
 Thea Beckman (1923–2004), Dutch writer
 Thea Bowman (1937–1990), American nun
 Thea Dorn, German writer
 Thea E. Smith, American writer
 Thea Einöder, German rower
 Thea Exley (1923–2007), Australian archivist and art historian
 Thea Flaum, American TV producer
 Thea Foss (1857–1927), American entrepreneur
 Thea Garrett, Maltese singer
 Thea Gill, Canadian actress
 Thea Gilmore, British singer-songwriter
 Thea Gregory, English actress
 Thea Halo, American writer
 Thea Hochleitner (1925–2012), Austrian alpine skier
 Thea Kano, American conductor
 Thea Kellner, Romanian fencer
 Thea King (1925–2007), British clarinettist
 Thea Knutzen (1930–2016), Norwegian politician
 Tea Jorjadze or Thea Djordjadze, Georgian artist
 Thea Leitner (1921–2016), Austrian writer
 Thea Sofie Loch Næss, Norwegian actress 
 Thea Muldoon (1927–2015), New Zealander first lady
 Thea Musgrave, Scottish composer
 Thea Porter (1927–2000), British fashion designer
 Thea Proctor (1879–1966), Australian artist
 Thea Rasche (1899–1971), German pilot
 Thea de Roos-van Rooden, Dutch historian and politician
 Thea Sharrock, English theatre director
 Thea Slatyer, Australian footballer
 Thea Stabell, Norwegian actress
 Thea Tewi (1902–1999), German-born American sculptor and lingerie designer
 Thea Trinidad, American wrestler
 Thea Vidale, American comedian and actress
 Thea Van Seijen, Dutch singer
 Thea von Harbou (1888–1954), German filmmaker and actress
 Thea White (1940–2021), American voice actress

Fictional characters 

 Thea Fenchel, the protagonist's love interest in Saul Bellow’s The Adventures of Augie March
 Thea Queen, an incarnation of the DC Comics' superheroine Speedy played by Willa Holland on the CW's 2012 television programme Arrow
 Thea Stilton, the main protagonist in the Thea Stilton book franchise and one of the main protagonists in the Geronimo Stilton book franchise
 Thea the Thursday Fairy, from the Rainbow Magic book franchise

References 

Feminine given names
Theophoric names